Ben Harper (born 1969) is an American musician. 

Ben Harper may also refer to:
Ben Harper (Yellowcard) (born 1980), punk rock lead guitarist of HeyMike! and previously of Yellowcard
Ben Harper (politician) (1817–1887), mayor of Rock Island, Illinois, 1854–1855
Ben Harper (My Family), character in the British sitcom My Family
Ben "Beanie" Harper, a character in the U.S. soap opera Love of Life
Ben Harper, a character in the 1955 film The Night of the Hunter
Benjamin Harper, oldest son of former Canadian Prime Minister Stephen Harper